Kurniawan is a surname and given name that may refer to:

As a surname:
Achmad Kurniawan (born 1979), Indonesian footballer
Agus Indra Kurniawan (born 1982), Indonesian professional footballer
Ari Kurniawan (born 1978), Indonesian footballer
Arip Kurniawan (born 1987), Indonesian footballer
Eddy Kurniawan, retired Chinese-Indonesian male badminton player
Edi Kurniawan (born 1988), Indonesian weightlifter
Eka Kurniawan, Indonesian writer
Fran Kurniawan (born 1985), male badminton player from Indonesia who specializes in doubles
Kim Kurniawan (born 1990), German born-Indonesian descent professional footballer
Kusnul Yuli Kurniawan (born 1978), Indonesian footballer
Rudy Hartono Kurniawan (born 1949), former Indonesian badminton star
Rudy Kurniawan (born 1976), wine collector and convicted perpetrator of wine fraud

As a given name:
Kurniawan Karman (born 1991), Indonesian professional footballer
Hendri Kurniawan Saputra (born 1981), Singaporean badminton player
Andre Kurniawan Tedjono (born 1986), male Indonesian badminton player who specializes in singles
Kurniawan Dwi Yulianto (born 1976), former Indonesian professional footballer

See also
Kurian

Indonesian-language surnames
Surnames of Indonesian origin